The Federaţia Română de Radioamatorism (FRR) (in English, Romanian Federation of Amateur Radio) is a national non-profit organization for amateur radio enthusiasts in Romania that serves as a national governing body for amateur radio competitions. FRR represents the interests of its members before Romanian and international telecommunications regulatory authorities. FRR is the national member society representing Romania in the International Amateur Radio Union.

See also 
International Amateur Radio Union

References 

Romania
Clubs and societies in Romania
Organizations established in 1933
1933 establishments in Romania
Radio in Romania
Organizations based in Bucharest